Lydimar Carolina Jonaitis Escalona (born October 12, 1985) is a Venezuelan actress, model and beauty queen who won the Miss Venezuela 2006 pageant, then went on to compete at the Miss Universe 2007 pageant, where she placed 2nd Runner-Up.

Pageant participation

Miss Venezuela 2006
On September 14, 2006, Jonaitis competed in Miss Venezuela 2006, held in Caracas, where she beat 27 other contestants and obtained the title of Miss Venezuela 2006. She became the eighth Miss Guárico to win that title since the Miss Venezuela pageant first began in 1952.

Miss Universe 2007
She then traveled to Mexico to represent Venezuela at the Miss Universe 2007 pageant in Mexico City on May 28, 2007. She became the 2nd Runner-Up of the pageant, only behind Japan's Riyo Mori (Winner) and Brazil's Natália Guimarães (1st Runner-Up).

Personal life
Ly is of Lithuanian,  and Venezuelan origin.

Jonaitis is a model who has worked with Metropolitan Models in France and modeled for Christian Dior, and other important fashion designers. She speaks Spanish, English and French.

Telenovelas 

Nacer contigo
Los misterios del amor

References

External links

Miss Venezuela Official Website
Miss Universe Official Website
Ly Jonaitis @ Bellas Venezolanas
Ly Jonaitis Photo Gallery

Living people
People from Valencia, Venezuela
Miss Venezuela winners
Venezuelan female models
Miss Universe 2007 contestants
1985 births
Venezuelan people of Lithuanian descent